{{DISPLAYTITLE:C16H17N3O2}}
The molecular formula C16H17N3O2 (molar mass: 283.331 g/mol) may refer to:

 Brevianamide F, or cyclo-(L-Trp-L-Pro)

Molecular formulas